Kateřina Brožová (born 9 February 1968 in Prague) is a Czech actress and singer.

Theatre
 Solange – Léto v Nohantu
 Roza – Tanec na konci léta
 Erna – Duše, krajina širá
 Orsetta – Poprask na laguně
 Gwendolina – Jak je důležité míti Filipa
 Angelika – Zdravý nemocný
 Elén – Jezinky a bezinky
 Vivienne – Taková ženská na krku
 Urraca – Cid
 Sylvie – Dva kavalíři z Verony
 Marie – Dům čtyř letor
 Hazel – Smutek sluší Elektře
 Anna – Markýza de Sade
 Jacqueline – A do pyžam!

Selected filmography

Films 
 Manželka Ronalda Sheldona (2001) TV
 Ohnivé jaro (1994)
 Vášnivé známosti (1994) TV 
 Šplhající profesor (1992) TV 
 Princezna Fantaghiro: Jeskyně Zlaté růže (1991) TV
 Radostný život posmrtný (1990) TV
 O Janovi a podivuhodném příteli (1990) TV

TV series 
 Modrý kód (2017–2018)
 Doktorka Kellerová (2016–2017)
 Stopy života (2014–2015)
 Cesty domů (2010)
 Pojišťovna štěstí (2004)

Discography

Studio albums
 Zpívám si (1997) 
 Obyčený příběh (1999)
 Ráda se svlíkám (2002) 
 American Dream (2005) 
 Christmas Dream (2005) 
 Kateřina (2006) 
 Nejkrásnější vánoční koledy (2009)

References

External links

Biography on csfd.cz

1968 births
Living people
Czech film actresses
21st-century Czech actresses
Czech stage actresses
Czech television actresses
20th-century Czech actresses
Academy of Performing Arts in Prague alumni
21st-century Czech women singers
Actresses from Prague
Czech voice actresses